Desert Bandit is a 1941 American Western film directed by George Sherman and written by Bennett Cohen and Eliot Gibbons. The film stars Don "Red" Barry, Lynn Merrick, William Haade, James Gillette, Dick Wessel and Tom Chatterton. It was released on May 24, 1941 by Republic Pictures.

Plot

Cast 
Don "Red" Barry as Bob Crandall
Lynn Merrick as Sue Martin
William Haade as Largo
James Gillette as Tim Martin
Dick Wessel as Hawk
Tom Chatterton as Captain Banning
Tom Ewell as Ordway
Robert Strange as Hatfield
Charles R. Moore as T-Bone Jones
Ernie Stanton as Sheriff Warde

References

External links
 

1941 films
1940s English-language films
American Western (genre) films
1941 Western (genre) films
Republic Pictures films
Films directed by George Sherman
American black-and-white films
1940s American films